Lend is the 4th district of the Austrian city of Graz. It is located on the west bank of the Mur and north of the district Gries and west of the district Innere Stadt and the Schloßberg.

It has a population of 28,249 (in 2011) and covers an area of 3.7 square kilometres. The postal codes of Lend are 8020 and 8051.

Points of interest
 Kalvarienbergkirche and Kalvarienberg
 Mariahilfer Kirche
 Grazer Kunsthaus
 Grazer Orpheum, a small theater built in 1899

References 
 

Districts of Graz